The Piano Sonata in E minor  566 by Franz Schubert is a sonata for solo piano written in June 1817.  The Rondo D. 506 is most likely the fourth movement according to Martino Tirimo.

Movements
I. Moderato
E minor
Harald Krebs has noted the use of Charles Fisk's "search for thematic identity" in his discussion of the sonata's opening theme.

II. Allegretto
E major

III. Scherzo: Allegro vivace - Trio
A-flat major

(IV. Rondo: Allegretto, D 506)
E major
D 506 has been associated with the last piece of Fünf Klavierstücke (D 459A/3) and the Adagio D 349 too as a set of movements that might form a sonata.

The work takes approximately 20 minutes to perform or 25–30 minutes with the rondo finale.

Notes

References
 Tirimo, Martino. Schubert: The Complete Piano Sonatas. Vienna: Wiener Urtext Edition, 1997.

External links 
 

Piano sonatas by Franz Schubert
1817 compositions
Compositions in E minor